Strength athletics in Norway refers to the participation of Norwegian competitors in the field of strength athletics in association with the World's Strongest Man.

History
The sport's roots have a long history going back many centuries before modern strongman competitions in the 1970s. However, Norway did not come onto the international scene in modern times until the mid-1990s. Norway has had mixed success on the international stage, with Svend Karlsen winning the 2001 World's Strongest Man title, Norway's only WSM title. In recent years, Norway has had several top international competitors in WSM, including Arild Haugen, Richard Skog, Odd Haugen and Espen Aune.

National Competitions

Norway's Strongest Man

Norway's Strongest Man is an annual strongman competition held in Norway. The event was established in 1998. Kurt Kvikkstad won in 1998 & 1999, with Roy Holte winning the next 3 years. Svend Karlsen took the 2003, 2005, and 2006 titles. Arild Haugen won in 2007 & 2008. Richard Skog won in 2009 & 2010. Espen Aune won in 2011, Skog did not compete due to injury.

Official results - top three places

Results courtesy of David Horne's World of Grip http://www.davidhorne-gripmaster.com/strongmanresults.html

Regional Competitions

Nordic Strongman Championships
The Nordic Strongman Championships consists of athletes from Iceland, Norway, Sweden, Finland and Denmark.

References

Norway
Strongmen competitions
Sport in Norway